The 1999–2000 FIS Freestyle Skiing World Cup was the twenty first World Cup season in freestyle skiing organised by International Ski Federation. The season started on 11 September 1999 and ended on 17 March 2000. This season included three disciplines: aerials, moguls, dual moguls, and ballet. The ballet title was not awarded and this was the last season ballet was on world cup calendar.

Dual moguls counted as the season title and was awarded with a small crystal globe separately from moguls.

Men

Moguls

Aerials

Ballet

Ladies

Moguls

Aerials

Ballet

Men's standings

Overall 

Standings after 20 races.

Moguls 

Standings after 7 races.

Aerials 

Standings after 7 races.

Dual moguls 

Standings after 4 races.

Ladies' standings

Overall 

Standings after 20 races.

Moguls 

Standings after 7 races.

Aerials 

Standings after 7 races.

Dual moguls 

Standings after 4 races.

Standings: Nations Cup

Overall 

Standings after 40 races.

Men 

Standings after 20 races.

Ladies 

Standings after 20 races.

References

FIS Freestyle Skiing World Cup
World Cup
World Cup